Jaffna Public Library is located in Jaffna, Sri Lanka. It is one of Jaffna's most notable landmarks, and is run by the Jaffna Municipal Council. The library was built in 1933 and burnt in 1981. During the early 1980s, it was one of the biggest libraries in Asia, containing over 97,000 books and manuscripts. Over a million books burned in the 1981 arson attack. Some ancient Sinhala and Tamil books were never recovered. In 2001, rehabilitation of the library was completed, with new structures being built and new books received, although its old books and manuscripts were not replaced. It is Sri Lanka's second main public Library, only rivalled by Colombo Public Library

The building's classical lines and beautiful proportions make it stand out architecturally. It contains lush gardens and has been modernized with new facilities such as free-wifi that was added in 2016

See also 
 Burning of Jaffna library

References

External links 

 Note on the history of Jaffna Public Library
 2009 documentary

1933 establishments in Ceylon
Cultural buildings in Jaffna
Libraries in Jaffna District
Tourist attractions in Northern Province, Sri Lanka